Alexander A. Voronov (born November 25, 1962) is a Russian-American mathematician specializing in mathematical physics, algebraic topology, and algebraic geometry.  He is currently a Professor of Mathematics at the University of Minnesota and a Visiting Senior Scientist at the Kavli Institute for the Physics and Mathematics of the Universe.

Biography 
Voronov graduated from Moscow State School 57 in 1980. He received an M.S. in Mathematics in 1985 and a Ph.D. in Mathematics at Moscow State University in 1988 under Yuri I. Manin. Alexander Voronov is known for his work on the super Mumford isomorphism (see Mumford measure), semi-infinite cohomology, operads in quantum field theory (see Swiss-cheese operad), Deligne's and Kontsevich's conjectures on Hochschild cohomology, cohomology of vertex operator algebras, and string topology (see cactus operad). He is a Fellow of the American Mathematical Society, an AMS Centennial Fellow,, a Simons Fellow, and a 2010 Japan Society for the Promotion of Science (JSPS) Research Fellow.

Selected publications

References

External links
 Alexander Voronov's University of Minnesota web page

Living people
University of Minnesota faculty
Michigan State University faculty
Mathematicians from Moscow
21st-century  American  mathematicians
20th-century American mathematicians
Russian emigrants to the United States
Moscow State University alumni
Fellows of the American Mathematical Society
1962 births